Labskaus is a culinary speciality from northern Germany and in particular from the cities of Bremen, Hamburg, and Lübeck. The main ingredients are salted meat or corned beef, potatoes, and onion. Some recipes put beetroot, pickled gherkin, or even herring into it, while others have these ingredients as side dishes.

Etymology

The origin of this word is uncertain. One possible source for the name could be Latvian Labs kauss, meaning 'good bowl' or hotpot, or Lithuanian labas káušas, meaning the same. The dish became common amongst  sailors and seamen during the time of the great ships. Potatoes and  salted meats were a standard fare and Labskaus would make a less-than-fresh cut of meat more palatable and stretch the meat supply.
Compare with scouse.

Preparation

The meal is traditionally prepared by boiling the beef in broth and then mincing it with the beetroot, onions, boiled potatoes and herring (some recipes use ham). Finally the base is fried in lard, condiments as nutmeg, pepper, coriander, or allspice are added.

The dish is similar to the British hash.

Countless variations of the dish exist. For example, in Bremen, 95 km (60 miles) away from Hamburg, Labskaus usually is a preparation of fried corned beef, onions and mashed potatoes with the beetroot and Rollmops being served as a side dish.

Variations of the dish are also to be found in Scandinavia, generally without the use of herring. In Denmark, the dish is similar to the Bremen version, but without the herring and some times with added gravy. In Sweden, Lapskojs is a stew made with beef and mashed potatoes. In Norway, the word lapskaus more often refers to a variation of beef stew often made with gravy, or in some cases other types of stew, more or less identical to the Liverpudlian scouse.

See also

 German cuisine
 
 List of beef dishes

References

Beef dishes
North German cuisine
Danish cuisine
German beef dishes